K.C. College of Engineering (KCCOE) is a private engineering college located in Thane, Mumbai, Maharashtra, India. The college is affiliated to the University of Mumbai and approved by Directorate of Technical Education (DTE), Maharashtra State and All India Council of Technical Education (AICTE), New Delhi.

History
K.C. College of Engineering and Management Studies & Research was established in 2001 by the Excelssior Education Society, offering three branches namely Electronics and Telecommunication Engineering, Computer Engineering, and Information Technology Engineering.

Academics
KCCOE offers undergraduate courses of study in engineering. The four-year undergraduate program leads to the degree of Bachelor of Engineering (BE). The courses offered are:
 Electronic and Telecommunication Engineering
 Computer Engineering
 Information Technology

Intakes
 Electronics and Telecommunication - 90
 Computer Engineering - 120
 Information Technology - 60

References

Engineering colleges in Mumbai
Affiliates of the University of Mumbai
Education in Thane
Educational institutions established in 2001
2001 establishments in Maharashtra